Pilar De Biase (born 30 October 1996) is an Argentinian born, Italian field hockey player.

Personal life
Pilar De Biase was born and raised in Santa Fe, Argentina.

Career

Club hockey 
De Biase currently plays in the Italian national league for HC Argentia.

National team
De Biase made her debut for the Italian national team in 2019 during a test series against Scotland.

In 2021, De Biase returned to the national team for the EuroHockey Championships in Amsterdam. She went on to represent the team again later that year at the European Qualifier for the 2022 FIH World Cup, held in Pisa.

International Goals

References

External links
 
 

1996 births
Living people
Italian female field hockey players
Sportspeople from Santa Fe, Argentina